In enzymology, a 2-furoate—CoA ligase is an enzyme that catalyzes the chemical reaction

ATP + 2-furoate + CoA  AMP + diphosphate + 2-furoyl-CoA

The 3 substrates of this enzyme are ATP, 2-furoate, and CoA, whereas its 3 products are AMP, diphosphate, and 2-furoyl-CoA.

This enzyme belongs to the family of ligases, specifically those forming carbon-sulfur bonds as acid-thiol ligases.  The systematic name of this enzyme class is 2-furoate:CoA ligase (AMP-forming). This enzyme is also called 2-furoyl coenzyme A synthetase.

References

 

EC 6.2.1
Enzymes of unknown structure